The Laver–Rosewall rivalry was a tennis rivalry in the 1960s and 1970s between Rod Laver and Ken Rosewall, widely regarded as two of the greatest tennis players of all time. In 1956 both players toured in the amateur circuit but never faced each other. Rosewall turned professional in January 1957 and the two did not meet until January 1963 when Laver turned pro. They played many times until 1977 when both semi-retired from the main tour.

Analysis 

Including tournaments and single-night events, they played at least 164 matches with Laver leading 89–75.

Their meetings took place in the span 1963–77.  They met in 13 individual years in that span, and in 9 of those 13 Laver had an edge, which can be explained considering that Laver faced an already declining Rosewall: in their first meeting ever, Rosewall was already 28 years of age.

After their 1969 Roland Garros final, Laver said, "Ken has consistently been my toughest opponent, on any surface, and we've played each other, I don't know, well over 200 times."

Head-to-head tallies

The following is a breakdown of their documented head-to-head results:

All matches: Laver 89–75
All finals: Laver 36–20
Grand Slams: 1–1
Pro Slams: Rosewall 6–5

Results per court surface

Grass courts: Laver 18–13
Hard courts: Laver 21–13 (18–12 on outdoor hard courts and 3–1 on indoor hard courts)
Clay courts: Laver 13–11
Indoor courts (carpet, wood, canvas – not including indoor hard courts and clay courts): Rosewall 38–34

List of all matches 
{| class="wikitable" style="font-size:90%;"
|-
| Legend:
|- bgcolor="#F6F9FF"
| Rod Laver's wins|- bgcolor="FFFFE9"
| Ken Rosewall's wins|-
|}

The star(*) means it was most probably canvas. During the World Tour in 63, they used their portable canvas surface .It's possible (but very unlikely) that in some stops they played on wood.

The double star(**) means it was most probably hard, but not yet confirmed.

Other matches:
 1964, 30 January – Brisbane tour match. Rain stopped match when Laver was ahead 4–6, 8–6, 1–0.
 1965, 24 January – Manly Tour. Rain stopped match when Rosewall was ahead 6–2, 3–2.
 1966, October–November – Tour in Nairobi, Entebbe, Accra and Lagos.  
 1967, August – Italian Tour, four cities with the pro troupe. 
 1967, October – Spain Tour with Laver, Rosewall, Gimeno and Stolle.

See also
 List of tennis rivalries
 Gonzales–Rosewall rivalry

Notes

References

Sources
 Joe McCauley, The History of Professional Tennis, London 2001
 World Tennis (The US Magazine)
 World of Tennis (Annuals edited by John Barrett)
 Tony Trabert in Tennis de France (French magazine)
Association of Tennis Professionals (ATP) Laver – Rosewall head to head

 External links 
 A rivalry for the ages by Bud Collins, at Australian newspaper The Age''

Tennis rivalries
Tennis in Australia
Sports rivalries in Australia